Martina Maria Ertl-Renz (born 12 September 1973) is a German former alpine skier. She was two times world champion and also won several medals at Olympic Winter Games and World Championships.

Biography
Martina Ertl is the sister of the German alpine ski Andreas Ertl.

Skiing career
Ertl started skiing at the age of two and a half. At the age of 18 she participated in the Junior World Championship in Hemsedal (Norway) winning a silver medal in Giant Slalom and a bronze medal in Combined.

This was the starting point of a long career. Until 2006 she took part in 430 World Cup races winning 14 of them. Ertl won the Giant Slalom World Cup in 1996 and 1998. She won three Olympic medals and four medals at World Championships (Bronze in Giant Slalom at Morioka 1993, Bronze medalist in Giant Slalom at Sierra Nevada 1996, Gold in Combined at St. Anton 2001, Gold in Nation Team Event at Bormio 2005).

She represented Germany at five Winter Olympics between 1992 and 2006, winning silver medals in the giant slalom in 1994 and the combined event in 1998, as well as a bronze medal in the combined event in 2002.

World Cup victories

Overall

Individual races

References

External links
 

1973 births
Living people
People from Bad Tölz
Sportspeople from Upper Bavaria
German female alpine skiers
Alpine skiers at the 1992 Winter Olympics
Alpine skiers at the 1994 Winter Olympics
Alpine skiers at the 1998 Winter Olympics
Alpine skiers at the 2002 Winter Olympics
Alpine skiers at the 2006 Winter Olympics
Olympic alpine skiers of Germany
Olympic silver medalists for Germany
Olympic bronze medalists for Germany
Olympic medalists in alpine skiing
FIS Alpine Ski World Cup champions
Medalists at the 2002 Winter Olympics
Medalists at the 1998 Winter Olympics
Medalists at the 1994 Winter Olympics